The  owns and maintains the Fukuoka and Kitakyūshū expressways in Fukuoka Prefecture, Japan.  It is headquartered in Higashi-ku, Fukuoka, Fukuoka Prefecture. The company was established on November 1, 1971 to manage the urban expressways built in the Fukuoka and Kitakyūshū areas.

Routes

Fūka Expressways 
 Fukuoka Expressway Circular Route
 Route 1 Kashi Line
 Route 2 Dazaifu Line
 Route 3 Airport Line
 Route 4 Kasuya Line
 Route 6 Island City Line

Kitakyushu Expressways 
 Route 1
 Route 2
 Route 3
 Route 4
 Route 5

References

External links 
 Fukuoka-Kitakyushu Expressway Public Corporation 
 福岡北九州高速道路公社 

Expressway companies of Japan